Notobryon clavigerum is a species of sea slug, a nudibranch, a marine gastropod mollusk in the family Scyllaeidae.

Description
The rhinophoral sheaths of Notobryon clavigerum have a crest which is oriented longitudinally running along the posterior margin and the anterior margin. It terminates distally in a wavy margin. With the exception of the tip, the edges of the dorsolateral lobes are smooth, stand up recurved, and display claw-like papillae that are small and in a row. There are three of these on the posterior and five on the anterior.

Distribution
This species is found in the Western Pacific Ocean such as in the waters of Japan.

References

Scyllaeidae
Gastropods described in 1937